The men's 500 metres competition at the 2018 European Speed Skating Championships was held on 5 January 2018.

Results
The race was started at 16:29.

References

Men's 500 metres